Two ships of the Royal Navy have borne the name HMS Lennox, probably after the historic Scottish region of Lennox, and its associated Duchy and Earldom:

  was a  destroyer, laid down as HMS Portia, but renamed HMS Lennox in 1913, before being launched in 1914.  She was sold in 1921.
She was ordered in 1939, but the order was cancelled and transferred to another shipyard. Lennox was eventually launched in 1943, and was broken up in 1961.

See also
Royal Navy ships named 

Royal Navy ship names